Jacori Hayes (born June 29, 1995) is an American professional soccer player currently playing for USL Championship club San Antonio FC. Hayes is typically deployed as a central midfielder.

Career

College 
Hayes grew up in Prince George County, Maryland. He was a four-year starter for the Wake Forest Demon Deacons. At Wake Forest, he made 84 appearances, scoring 15 goals and picking up 15 assists.

Professional 
Hayes was selected by FC Dallas in the first round of the 2017 MLS SuperDraft on January 13, 2017. He made his professional debut in FCD's match against Sporting Kansas City on March 11, 2017.

On April 14, 2018, Hayes scored his first MLS goal against New England Revolution.

Hayes was traded to Minnesota United on January 21, 2020, in exchange for a third-round MLS SuperDraft pick. Following the 2022 season, his contract option was declined by Minnesota.

On March 7, 2023, Hayes signed with USL Championship side San Antonio FC ahead of their 2023 season.

Honors 
Wake Forest
ACC Tournament Championship: 2016

Individual
All-ACC Freshman Team: 2013
All-ACC First Team: 2015, 2016
NSCAA All-South Region Second Team: 2015, 2016
All-ACC Tournament Team: 2015, 2016

References

External links 
 
 
 Jacori Hayes at Wake Forest
 

1995 births
Living people
American soccer players
African-American soccer players
All-American men's college soccer players
Association football midfielders
D.C. United U-23 players
FC Dallas draft picks
FC Dallas players
Major League Soccer players
Minnesota United FC players
North Texas SC players
People from Bowie, Maryland
Portland Timbers U23s players
San Antonio FC players
Soccer players from Maryland
Sportspeople from the Washington metropolitan area
FC Tulsa players
USL Championship players
USL League One players
USL League Two players
Wake Forest Demon Deacons men's soccer players
21st-century African-American sportspeople